Zhovtnevyi Raion is a common Soviet Ukrainian name for raions (districts) in a number of cities across Ukraine as well as a subdivision of Mykolaiv Oblast. The name is dedicated to the October Revolution.

Existing
 Zhovtnevyi Raion, Luhansk

Former
 Zhovtnevyi Raion, Kiev
 Zhovtnevyi Raion, Odessa Oblast, in Odessa Oblast (1923–59)
 Zhovtnevyi Raion, Dnipropetrovsk
 Zhovtnevyi Raion, Zaporizhia
 Zhovtnevyi Raion, Kryvyi Rih
 Zhovtnevyi Raion, Mariupol
 Zhovtnevyi Raion, Kharkiv
 Vitovka Raion, until 2016 Zhovtneve Raion, in Mykolaiv Oblast